Irakli, Irakly, or Erekle is a Georgian version of the Greek name Heracles, and is a popular masculine name in Georgia.

Notable people with these names include:

Erekle
Erekle I, Prince of Mukhrani (1560–1605), Georgian nobleman
Prince Erekle of Kakheti (1568–1589), Georgian prince
Erekle I of Kartli (1642–1709), ruler in Georgia
Erekle II, Prince of Mukhrani (1666–1723), Georgian nobleman
Erekle II (1720–1798), ruler in Georgia

Irakli
Irakli Abashidze (1909–1992), Georgian poet, literary scholar and politician
Irakli Abuseridze (born 1977), Georgian rugby player
Irakli Alasania (born 1973), Georgian politician, soldier and diplomat 
Irakly Andronikov (1908–1990), Russian literature historian, philologist, and media personality
Irakli Bagration of Mukhrani (1909–1977), Georgian prince
Irakli Bolkvadze (born 1994), Georgian swimmer
Irakli Garibashvili (born 1982), 11th Prime Minister of Georgia
Irakli Charkviani (1961–2006), Georgian poet, writer, and musician
Irakli Chkhikvadze (born 1987), Georgian rugby player
Irakli Danylovich (c. 1223-1240), Ruthenian prince
Irakli Giorgadze (born 1982), Georgian rugby player
Irakli Gruzinsky (1826–1882), Georgian prince
Irakli Kakabadze (born c. 1969), Georgian human rights activist
Irakli Klimiashvili (born 1988), Georgian footballer
Irakli Kobalia (born 1992), Georgian footballer
Irakli Kvekveskiri (born 1990), Georgian footballer
Irakli Labadze (born 1981), Georgian tennis player
Irakli Logua (born 1991), Russian footballer
Irakli Machkhaneli (born 1981), Georgian rugby player
Irakli Menagarishvili (born 1951), Georgian politician and diplomat
Irakli Modebadze (born 1984), Georgian footballer
Irakli Mosidze, Georgian wrestler
Irakli Murjikneli (born 1983), Georgian Opera Singer (Tenor)
Irakli Ochiauri (1924–2015), Georgian painter and sculptor 
Irakli Okruashvili (born 1973), Georgian politician
Irakli Revishvili (born 1989), Georgian swimmer
Irakly Shanidze (born 1968), Georgian creative director and photographer
Irakli Sirbiladze (born 1982), Georgian footballer
Irakli Tsereteli (1881–1959), Georgian politician
Irakli Tsirekidze (born 1982), Georgian judoka
Irakli Turmanidze (born 1984), Georgian weightlifter

See also
Irakli (beach), on the Black Sea in Bulgaria
Society of Erekle II, a Georgian NGO

Georgian masculine given names